The Centre for Foundation Studies (CFS) is a pre-university educational institution under the International Islamic University Malaysia (IIUM) located in Gambang, Pahang, Malaysia. It offers 19 foundation programmes over the course of three semesters for both science and arts-based courses. Graduates from CFS would further their studies at the degree campus of IIUM in Gombak, Kuantan, or Pagoh in their respective programmes.

Foundation programmes at CFS are offered for Malaysians with Sijil Pelajaran Malaysia (SPM) qualifications, whereas those without such qualifications would undergo its sister-institution, IIUM Academy situated in both the CFS campus in Gambang, as well as IIUM's main campus in Gombak for certain courses.

History 
The centre was opened in July 1985 as Matriculation Centre in Subang Jaya, providing pre-university studies for future IIUM students in economics and Islamic revealed knowledge & human sciences (IRKHS). The institution formerly offers 2-year matriculation programmes before being upgraded to CFS, offering 1.5 years, and now 1-year foundation programmes. The centre was then moved to another location in Lembah Pantai.

In 2001, the centre was then moved to IIUM's former main campus in Petaling Jaya, upon the completion of the new main campus in Gombak, 1995. After being briefly moved to another site in Nilai, Negeri Sembilan and the Gombak campus, the centre was moved to IIUM's medical campus in Kuantan in December 2017 while a new campus was built for the foundation centre in Gambang. During that time, the centre slowly moved to the new Gambang campus by stages until its full transition in 2019.

The Gambang campus will continue to expand to accommodate more students and facilities, having only completed its second phase as of 2023.

In November 2022, CFS hosted the inaugural Conference on Future and Sustainable Education (CFSE), the first national-level conference with both a research paper presentation as well as a research poster competition among scholars, intellectuals, and professionals. CFSE 2022 involved universities, pre-university institutions and secondary schools from all over Malaysia as well as other countries. The conference was held in collaboration with the Higher Education Leadership Academy (AKEPT).

In March 2023, CFS served as the host university for the 2023 Malaysian Foundation Games (Sukan Asasi Malaysia), involving 13 foundation institutions across the country.

Campus 
Throughout its operation, CFS (and its former Matriculation Centre) has been situated in seven separate campuses, in Subang Jaya, Lembah Pantai, Petaling Jaya, Nilai, Gombak (IIUM main campus), Kuantan (IIUM medical campus), and finally Gambang in 2019.

Gambang campus 

The Gambang campus began its construction in 2012, planned as a new 200-acre campus specially made for CFS. The campus property is run by Konsesi Pusat Asasi Gambang Sdn Bhd (KPAG) in agreement with IIUM and the Malaysian government, except for two subplots which is the administration building and the Mahallah al-Biruni hostel. The campus reached usable stages in 2017 as the centre began to slowly move from its temporary area in IIUM's Kuantan campus. Full transition was completed in 2019 after the campus was deemed suitable enough for full usage. As of 2023, the campus is still undergoing expansion works for its next phases to allow for more students and facilities within the centre.

The officiation of the Gambang campus is set to commence in October 2023 in conjunction with IIUM's 40th anniversary.

The campus is equipped with its own mosque, auditorium, multipurpose halls, studios, laboratory, a library, hostels, sports centre, stadium and others. At the heart of the campus is the Student Centre, with the main cafeteria and the IIUM Sejahtera Clinic, as well as the Dar al-Hikmah Library.

Health facility 
The Gambang campus has its own clinic, the IIUM Sejahtera Clinic located within the Student Centre complex. The clinic is well-equipped with various medical facilities including a radiology room, dentistry room and optometry room, aside others. The clinic serves provides primary care services to students and staff members of CFS. Further cases would be referred to the Sultan Ahmad Shah Medical Centre (SASMEC@IIUM) at IIUM Kuantan.

Library 
The Dar al-Hikmah Library in CFS is situated beside the Student Centre in the middle of the campus. The library is smaller compared to other libraries in IIUM, but still provides facilities such as a computer room, multi-purpose halls and rooms, carrel units, discussion rooms, and even a cafe.

Sports facilities 

The campus is equipped with a sports complex named the Al-Fatih Sports Centre after the Ottoman Sultan, Muhammad Al-Fatih. The sports centre has a stadium with a track and field, next to a multipurpose court and an archery range.

Within the hostels, there are also gymnasiums for both male and female students, as well as smaller courts for netball, sepak takraw, and badminton, and a second field for rugby and football. The Al-Khawarizmi main multipurpose hall also serves as the main badminton court.

In March 2023, the CFS sports facilities were used to host the 2023 Malaysian Foundation Games.

Hostel 

CFS can house a total of 3952 students within their six mahallat (plural of mahallah, meaning hostel), two of them being for male students and four for female students. The mahallat are as follows (capacity in brackets):

 Mahallah Al-Zahrawi (800)
 Mahallah Al-Biruni (752)
 Mahallah Azdah (800)
 Mahallah Umamah (800)
 Mahallah Fatima Al-Majritiya (800)
 Mahallah Aishah (800)

Each mahallah provides facilities such as laundry, study rooms, and TV rooms, while certain facilities such as cafeterias and convenience shops are limited to certain mahallat such as Mahallah Al-Biruni and Mahallah Fatima Al-Majritiya. Four of the mahallat provide rooms for disabled students located at the ground floor with in-room access to the toilet as well as a more accessible layout for navigation and movement.

Prayer sites 
Every building in CFS Gambang has their own musolla or prayer room. The main prayer site is the CFS Mosque (officially Masjid Pusat Asasi UIAM in Malay) located near the gate of the campus, which also serves as the mosque for nearby college campus residents to perform the main congregational prayers such as the Friday prayer. The mosque is under the management of both the university administration (under the Spiritual Development Department) as well as the students (under the Imaratul Masjid Club).

Academics 

During every main intake which takes place in August every year, the centre takes in nearly 4,000 students for its 19 programmes. As of 2023, the foundation programmes offered by the university are:

 Allied Health Sciences
 Arabic Language
 Arabic for International Communication
 Architecture and Environmental Design
 Biological Sciences
 Dentistry
 Economics and Management Sciences
 Engineering
 English Language
 English for International Communication
 Human Sciences
 Islamic Revealed Knowledge
 Laws
 Malay for International Communication
 Medicine
 Nursing
 Physical Sciences
 Pharmacy
 Tourism Planning and Hospitality Management

The centre formerly offers a foundation programme in Information and Communications Technology, but it was later merged with the foundation programme in Engineering.

Most programmes are taught in English, with the exception of Arabic Language, Arabic for International Communication and Islamic Revealed Knowledge being taught in Arabic, and Malay for International Communication being taught in Malay.

All students are required to undergo two semesters of Usrah programmes, as well as university core courses which includes Understanding Islam, and Basic Application of ICT.

Student activity 

Much like in the main campuses, CFS students are also encouraged to actively undergo curricular activities during their time of study. There are more than 30 societies, each running their own activities across the year. Every student would automatically join their own kulliyyah-based society based on their programme, and can further pick which other societies to join.

Among the main activities in CFS include oratory activities such as debating and mock parliament, sports, and martial arts such as silat and aikido.

Students are given intensives in the form of "starpoints" (student activity record point) based on their level of activity in co-curricular works.

References

External links 

International Islamic University Malaysia
Organisation of Islamic Cooperation affiliated agencies
Universities and colleges in Pahang
Islamic universities and colleges in Malaysia
Educational institutions established in 1985
Foundation schools